From Our Living Room to Yours is the second album by the American Analog Set, released in 1997 on Emperor Jones. It was recorded on analog equipment at the band's Austin, Texas, home.

Critical reception
SF Weekly wrote that "on 'Where Have All the Good Boys Gone', the relative hush and use of empty space allow aural elements that would have been drowned out in a Great Wall of Marshall stacks to stand crisp and resolute." Rolling Stone called the album "an evocative blend of psychedelic melancholia." 

The Chicago Tribune deemed it "a woefully overlooked gem," writing that the band "used a handful of keyboards, guitars and percussion to produce a dreamy, trippy tapestry of minimalist hooks." Nashville Scene labeled the songs' grooves "mesmerizing, like hearing all the odd juxtapositions of an old Yes song smoothed out and shaped into something gentle and calm."

Track listing

References

1997 albums
The American Analog Set albums